Graduate School of Letters and Faculty of Letters (京都大学大学院文学研究科･文学部) is one of the schools at Kyoto University. The Faculty (Undergraduate) and Graduate School operate as one.

According to QS World University Rankings by Subject 2022: Arts and Humanities, Kyoto University is ranked 2nd in Japan and 58th in the world.

As of 2020, there are 1,075 undergraduate and 464 graduate students.

Organization

Program 

 Undergraduate Program
 First year: liberal arts education
 Second year: choosing a Division
 Third year: choosing a Department
 Fourth year: submitting a graduation thesis
 Graduate Programs
 2-year Master's Program (for Bachelor's degree holders)
 3-year Doctoral Program (for Master's degree holders)

Divisions 
It has 5 divisions and dozens of departments, which cover almost all areas of the humanities.

See also 

 Kyoto School
 Heidelberg University

References

External links 

 Graduate School of Letters / Faculty of Letters, Kyoto University

Letters